Tickell's bat (Hesperoptenus tickelli) is a species of vesper bat. It can be found in Bangladesh Bhutan, Cambodia, possibly China, India, Myanmar, Nepal, Sri Lanka and Thailand.

Description

Females are larger than males. Generally color varies from grayish yellow to bright golden brown. Underside grayer and lighter. Fur is soft and dense. Digits of hands and feet are pinkish and the membrane between them is blackish. Inter-femoral membrane is pinkish tending to become black towards the outer margin. Muzzle is broad and swollen. Claws black. Tail is enclosed in a membrane the tip.

References

Mammals of Nepal
Mammals of India
Mammals of Sri Lanka
Taxonomy articles created by Polbot
Mammals described in 1851
Bats of Asia
Taxa named by Edward Blyth